Chelsea Frei is an American actress. She is known for portraying Bridget Moody in the American TV series The Moodys.

Early life 
Frei grew up in Andover, Massachusetts and received a BFA in acting from New York University.

Career 
In 2017, Frei starred in the film Sideswiped. She went on to star as Victoria Gotti in the Lifetime biopic, Victoria Gotti: My Father's Daughter. From 2019 to 2021, Frei starred as Bridget Moody in The Moodys. Other credits include Shrill, The Last O.G., and The Addams Family (2019).

In 2022, Frei played Ingrid in the HBO series The Time Traveler's Wife, and Maya Campbell in The Cleaning Lady.

Filmography

References

External links
 

Living people
New York University alumni
Actors from Massachusetts
21st-century American actresses
Year of birth missing (living people)